Hahncappsia alpinensis is a moth in the family Crambidae. It was described by Hahn William Capps in 1967. It is found in North America, where it has been recorded from Arizona, New Mexico and Texas.

The wingspan is 20–23 mm for males and 21–23 mm for females. Adults have been recorded on the wing from March to September.

References

Moths described in 1967
Pyraustinae